This is a list of monuments that are classified by the Moroccan ministry of culture around Salé.

Monuments and sites in Salé 

|}

References 

Salé
Salé